Social entropy is a sociological theory that evaluates social behaviours using a method based on the second law of thermodynamics. The equivalent of entropy in a social system is considered to be wealth or residence location. The theory was introduced by Kenneth D. Bailey in 1990.

References

Further reading
 Klaus Krippendorff's Dictionary of Cybernetics (University of Pennsylvania)
 Kenneth D. Bailey (1990). Social Entropy Theory. Albany, New York: State University of New York (SUNY) Press. ISSN 1094-429X

Sociological theories
Social systems
Sociological terminology
Cyberpunk themes